Maurice Considine (born 26 June 1932) is a former Australian rules footballer who played in the Victorian Football League during the 1950s.  He played 37 games for Hawthorn between 1952 and 1956. He was recruited from the Old Paradians Amateur Football Club in the Victorian Amateur Football Association (VAFA).

His older brother Bernie, younger brother Frank and son Paul also played football for Hawthorn.

Considine coached Old Paradians to four premierships before becoming John Kennedy's assistant coach at Hawthorn. He was named as coach of the Old Paradians Team of the Century. For his services to Hawthorn as player and reserves coach he was awarded life membership of the club in 1970.

Considine co-founded the Melbourne transport company Secon Carriers (now Secon Freight Logistics) in 1969. In 2019, to mark the company's 50th anniversary, he wrote a business memoir, It's in Our Blood.

Honours and achievements
Individual
 Hawthorn life member

References

External links

Profile at Hawk Headquarters

Living people
1932 births
Australian rules footballers from Victoria (Australia)
Hawthorn Football Club players
Old Paradians Amateur Football Club players
Australian rules football coaches
Australian company founders